Lázaro Mazón Alonso (born 17 December 1959) is a Mexican politician affiliated with the PRD. He served as Senator of the LX and LXI Legislatures of the Mexican Congress representing Guerrero. Previously, he served as municipal president of Iguala de la Independencia from 1996 to 1999 and from 2002 to 2005.

References

1959 births
Living people
Politicians from Guerrero
Members of the Senate of the Republic (Mexico)
Party of the Democratic Revolution politicians
20th-century Mexican politicians
21st-century Mexican politicians
Municipal presidents in Guerrero
National Autonomous University of Mexico alumni